Suwanda Denuna Jeewithe is a 2010 Sinhala-language romantic musical film written and directed and produced by Dhammika Siriwardana. The film stars Roshan Ranawana and Pooja Umashankar in lead roles along with Gayathri Dias, Rex Kodippili, Himali Siriwardena and Pubudu Chathuranga.

Shooting of the film was commenced on 6 August 2008 in and around Nuwara Eliya, Badulla, Bandarawela, Welimada and Colombo.

Plot 
Ayeshmantha, owner of his father's business, falls in love with a girl named Rashi, only to find she is marrying. Saddened, Ayeshmantha loses interest in the family business and considers suicide. He leaves home only to find Rashmi, who persuades him to not kill himself. Rashmi sends Ayeshmantha to live with her aunts.

Rashmi's aunts are suspicious of a would be love affair between Ayeshmantha and Rashmi, therefore disallowing Ayeshmantha to live there further. Rashmi breaks up with her fiancé. Meanwhile, Ayeshmantha decides to restore the family business.

Ayeshmantha decides to look for Rashmi. His ex-husband tells of the results of their relationships. Ayeshmantha decides to look for Rashmi, and encounters her in a churchyard, eventually leading to the development of their relationship.

Cast 
 Roshan Ranawana as Ayeshmantha, protagonist
 Pooja Umashankar as Rashmi, girl secretly in love with Ayeshmantha
 Gayathri Dias as Rashmi's aunt
 Ramani Siriwardana as Ayeshmantha's mother
 Srimal Wedisinghe as Rashmi's father
 Maureen Charuni as Rashmi's mother
 Rex Kodippili as Ayeshmantha's father
 Himali Siriwardena as Rukshi Siriwardena
 Pubudu Chathuranga as Prasad, Rashmi' ex boyfriend
 Sanath Gunathilake in minor role
 Raja Ganeshan as Ramayya
 Shanudrie Priyasad as Senuri
 Sandali Walikanna as Wenuri
 Richard Manamudali as PHI
 Sarath Kulanga as PHI
 Giriraj Kaushalya in cameo appearance
 Semini Iddamalgoda in cameo appearance

Soundtrack

Release 
The film was a commercial success, and helped Umashankar, who plays the role of Rashmi, rise in popularity. The soundtrack was successful as well.

References 

2010 films
2010s Sinhala-language films